William Forrest Hunter (December 10, 1808 – March 30, 1874) was an American lawyer and politician who served two terms as a U.S. Representative from Ohio from 1849 to 1853.

Early life and career 
Born in Alexandria, Virginia, Hunter received a common-school training. He studied law and was admitted to the bar. He commenced practice in Woodsfield, Ohio.

Congress 
Hunter was elected as a Whig to the Thirty-first and Thirty-second Congresses (March 4, 1849 – March 3, 1853). He was not a candidate for renomination in 1852.

Death
He died in Woodsfield, Ohio, on March 30, 1874, and was interred in Woodsfield Cemetery.

Sources
 

1808 births
1874 deaths
Politicians from Alexandria, Virginia
People from Woodsfield, Ohio
Ohio lawyers
Whig Party members of the United States House of Representatives from Ohio
19th-century American politicians
Lawyers from Alexandria, Virginia
19th-century American lawyers